The 2009–10 Emporia State Lady Hornets basketball team represented Emporia State University in the 2009–10 NCAA Division II women's basketball season, which was the team's 36th basketball season. Led by Head Coach Brandon Schneider, who finished his 12th season at Emporia State, the Lady Hornets won the 2010 NCAA Women's Division II Basketball Tournament, claiming the school's first national title in any sport. The team played its home games at William L. White Auditorium in Emporia, Kansas, its home court since 1974. Emporia State is a member of the Mid-America Intercollegiate Athletics Association.

2009–10 Roster

Media
The Lady Hornets basketball games were broadcast on KFFX-FM, Mix 104.9.

Schedule
Source: 

|-
!colspan=12 style="background:#231F20; color:white;"|Exhibition

|-
!colspan=12 style="background:#231F20; color:white;"|Regular season

|-
!colspan=12 style="background:#231F20; color:white;"|2010 MIAA Tournament

|-
!colspan=12 style="background:#231F20; color:white;"|2010 NCAA Tournament

References

Emporia State Lady Hornets basketball seasons
2009 in sports in Kansas
2010 in sports in Kansas
Emporia State